Pulpí is a municipality of Almería province, in the autonomous community of Andalusia, Spain.

Demographics

Largest salad
On September 29, 2007, Pulpí tossed the world's largest salad, with 6,700 kilograms (14,740 pounds) of lettuce, tomato, onion, pepper and olives, supervised by 20 cooks over 3 hours. A Guinness World Records judge was present to confirm the new record. The salad was prepared in a container 18 m (59 ft) long and 4.8 m (15.7 ft) wide.

Pulpí Geode
In December 1999, the Pulpí Geode was discovered in the Pilar de Jaravía lead mine by the Grupo Mineralogista de Madri.

External links
  Pulpí - Sistema de Información Multiterritorial de Andalucía
  Pulpí - Diputación Provincial de Almería

References

Municipalities in the Province of Almería